The 1913–14 Cornell Big Red men's ice hockey season was the 13th season of play for the program.

Season
Without the Intercollegiate Hockey Association, and more specifically the St. Nicholas Rink, to provide a stable venue for the Big Red, Cornell was limited to just five games during the season. On a positive note the team ended the program's losing streak at 8 games. The team was able to fix the goaltending woes that had plagued them the year before but the offense had yet to find its footing.

Roster

Standings

Schedule and Results

|-
!colspan=12 style=";" | Regular Season

References

Cornell Big Red men's ice hockey seasons
Cornell
Cornell
Cornell
Cornell